The 2023 St. George Illawarra Dragons season is the 25th in the club's history. They will compete in the National Rugby League's 2023 Telstra Premiership. The Captain Ben Hunt and Head Coach Anthony Griffin retain their club roles for the 3rd consecutive season.

Player movement
These movements happened across the previous season, off-season and pre-season.

Gains

Losses

Pre-Season Challenge

Regular season
FG = Field Goal 
PG = Penalty Goal

2023 squad

References

St. George Illawarra Dragons seasons
St. George Illawarra Dragons season
2023 NRL Women's season